Daniel Joseph Griffin (born 10 August 1977 in Belfast) is a Northern Irish retired footballer. He was primarily a defender, but could also play in midfield. He is a youth coach with his first professional club, St Johnstone.

Career
At age 15, he left high school in Belfast six months early to join St Johnstone. He made his professional debut two years later. It was while he was with the McDiarmid Park club that Griffin made his international debut against Germany in a 1–1 draw on 29 May 1996 in Belfast and scored his first international goal in a friendly against the Republic of Ireland three years, to the day, later.

In the following months, English club Derby County offered St Johnstone £1,000,000 for their 18-year-old centre-back. Griffin was beginning to develop a good relationship with St Johnstone and he felt there was much more he could learn from Paul Sturrock, so he turned down the move. In 1996, Griffin scored an own goal, the only goal of the game, in the Scottish Challenge Cup Final loss to Stranraer.

After seven years in Perth, Griffin followed manager Paul Sturrock to Tayside rivals Dundee United, for whom he would eventually become captain. Following injury problems, Griffin lost his regular place and joined English side Stockport County in 2004 as a free agent. After being released by Stockport, in December 2005 he signed for Aberdeen. Just four months later, however, he was informed that the club would not renew his contract at the end of the season.

In June 2006, Griffin became one of new Dundee manager Alex Rae's first signings, agreeing a two-year contract. On 8 January 2007 he left the club by mutual consent and joined Ross County a week later. Griffin was released by Ross County after suffering more injuries. He then joined Livingston in January 2009. After winning the third division championship with Livingston, Griffin joined Arbroath in June 2010 on a one-year deal<ref>Griffin Joins Lichties Deal , The Courier.</ref> where he won the third division title for a second successive season.

International goalsScores and results list Northern Ireland's goal tally first. ''

Career statistics

Honours
St Johnstone
Scottish Challenge Cup runner-up: 1
 1996–97
Scottish League Cup runner-up: 1
 1998–99

Livingston
Scottish Third Division winner: 1
 2009–10

Arbroath
Scottish Third Division winner: 1
 2010–11

References

External links
 

1977 births
Living people
Association footballers from Northern Ireland
Scottish Premier League players
Scottish Football League players
St Johnstone F.C. players
Dundee United F.C. players
Stockport County F.C. players
Aberdeen F.C. players
Association footballers from Belfast
Dundee F.C. players
Ross County F.C. players
Livingston F.C. players
Northern Ireland international footballers
Arbroath F.C. players
Association football defenders
Association football midfielders
Alumni of Scotland's Rural College